Tales dos Santos (born 1 June 1984) is a retired association football player who played as a defender.

Career

Tales Dos Santos' career is a familiar one to that of many Brazilian footballers He has played for numerous clubs and good experience. In 2014, he was set to sign for Sabah FA however due to league restrictions he was unable to sign for the club. He went on to sign for V.League 1 club Sanna Khanh Hoa F.C.

After leaving Vietnam, Tales underwent trials at several Indonesian sides namely Persija Jakarta and Persela Lamongan but ultimately failed to gain a contract.

Honours

Team
 2012 Singapore League Cup Champions with DPMM FC
 2012 S.League Runner-Up with DPMM FC
 2013 Singapore League Cup Runner -up with DPMM FC

References

1984 births
Living people
Brazilian expatriate footballers
Brazilian footballers
DPMM FC players
Expatriate footballers in Brunei
Expatriate footballers in Thailand
Singapore Premier League players
Tocantins Futebol Clube players
Associação Atlética Alvorada players
Association football defenders
Sportspeople from Goiás
Brazilian expatriate sportspeople in Brunei